The following outline is provided as an overview of and topical guide to the American Civil War:

American Civil War – civil war in the United States of America that lasted from 1861 to 1865. Eleven Southern slave states declared their secession from the United States and formed the Confederate States of America, also known as "the Confederacy." Led by Jefferson Davis, the Confederacy fought against the United States (the Union), which was supported by all the free states (where slavery had been abolished) and by five slave states that became known as the border states.

Etymology
 Names of the American Civil War

Combatants
 The Union (USA) also known as "The North" Union Army Union Navy

vs.

 The Confederacy (CSA) also known as "The South" Confederate Army Confederate Navy

Union
 Abraham Lincoln
 Medal of Honor
 Old Glory
 Yankee

Confederacy
 Jefferson Davis
 Flags of the Confederate States of America

Pre-war environment
 Antebellum era
 James Batchelder
 Bleeding Kansas
 John Brown (abolitionist)
 Anthony Burns
 John C. Calhoun
 Compromise of 1850
 Corwin Amendment
 Crittenden Compromise
 Force Bill
 Free Methodist Church
 Filibuster (military)
 Gag rule
 Georgia Platform
 Golden Circle (proposed country)
 Kansas–Nebraska Act
 Knights of the Golden Circle
 Manifest Destiny
 Missouri Compromise
 Morrill Land-Grant Colleges Act
 Morrill Tariff
 National Banking Act
 New York City secession
 Nullification Crisis
 Oberlin College
 Oberlin–Wellington Rescue
 Presbyterian Church
 Dred Scott
 Supreme Court cases of the American Civil War
 Third Party System
 Nat Turner
 Uncle Tom's Cabin
 Underground Railroad
 1860 United States presidential election
 Wilmot Proviso

Origins of the war

Origins of the American Civil War
 Abolition
 John Brown
 Frederick Douglass
 William Lloyd Garrison
 Lysander Spooner
 Harriet Tubman
 Underground Railroad
 Northwest Ordinance of 1787
 Missouri Compromise
 Nullification Crisis
 Compromise of 1850
 Antebellum era
 Bleeding Kansas
 Border states
 Secession
 President Lincoln's 75,000 Volunteers
 Slavery
 African-Americans
 Cornerstone speech
 Emancipation Proclamation
 Fugitive slave laws
 Slave power
 Uncle Tom's Cabin
 States' rights

During the war
 Andersonville National Historic Site
 Christmas in the American Civil War
 Dahlgren Affair
 Emancipation Proclamation
 Habeas corpus
 Income tax in the United States
 Kaiser Burnout
 Mother's Day
 New York Draft Riots
 Nickajack
 The Philadelphia Inquirer
 Quantrill's Raiders
 Republic of Winston
 Sex in the American Civil War
 Thanksgiving: Lincoln and the Civil War
 Turning point of the American Civil War
 United States National Academy of Sciences
 1864 United States presidential election
 West Virginia

Commerce and Infrastructure
 Blockade runners of the American Civil War
 Confederate railroads in the American Civil War
 Confederate States of America dollar
 Cotton
 History of cotton
 King Cotton
 Cotton diplomacy
 Cotton gin
 Economy of the Confederate States of America
 Economy of the U.S. during the American Civil War
 National Bank Act
 Postage stamps and postal history of the Confederate States
 Salt in the American Civil War
 Southern Bread Riots
 Tredegar Iron Works
 Trent Affair

Military Forces

Confederate Forces
 Military of the Confederate States of America
 Confederate Home Guard
 Confederate States Army
 Confederate States Marine Corps
 Confederate States Navy
 General officers in the Confederate States Army
 Missouri State Guard
 The Citadel
 Uniforms of the Confederate States military forces
 Virginia Military Institute

Union Forces
 Uniform of the Union Army
 Union Army
 Union Army Balloon Corps
 Union Navy
 United States Marine Corps
 United States Military Academy
 U.S. Military Telegraph Corps
 United States Naval Academy
 United States Sanitary Commission

General Military

The Armed Personnel
 Infantry in the American Civil War
 Zouaves of the American Civil War
 Cavalry in the American Civil War
 Field artillery in the American Civil War
 Siege artillery in the American Civil War
 Military leadership in the American Civil War
 Brevet
 List of American Civil War generals
 Confederate Generals
 Acting Confederate Generals
 Union Generals
 Union Brevet Generals

Firearms
 Brooke rifle
 Canister shot
 Coal torpedo
 Enfield rifles
 Fayetteville rifle
 Field artillery in the American Civil War
 Henry rifle
 Ketchum Grenade
 Land mine
 M1819 Hall rifle
 Machine gun
 Minié ball
 Naval mine
 Parrott rifle
 Pratt & Whitney
 Sharps rifle
 Spencer repeating rifle
 Springfield Model 1861
 Springfield Model 1863

Ships and Submarines
 CSS Virginia
 CSS Stonewall
 Confederate privateer
 H. L. Hunley
 Hospital ship
 Ironclad warship
 Submarines in the American Civil War
 Turret ship

Military strategy
 Military strategy in the industrial age
 Espionage (spies)
 Allan Pinkerton
 Confederate Secret Service
 Guerrilla warfare in the American Civil War
 Bushwhacker
 Jayhawker
 Scorched earth

Fighting the War

Theaters
 Eastern Theater of the American Civil War
 Western Theater of the American Civil War
 Lower Seaboard Theater of the American Civil War
 Trans-Mississippi Theater of the American Civil War
 Pacific Coast Theater of the American Civil War
 Union naval blockade

Campaigns

American Civil War Campaigns
 Anaconda Plan
 New Mexico Campaign
 Jackson's Valley Campaign
 Peninsula Campaign
 Northern Virginia Campaign
 Maryland Campaign
 Stones River Campaign
 Vicksburg Campaign
 Tullahoma Campaign
 Gettysburg Campaign
 Morgan's Raid
 Bristoe Campaign
 Knoxville Campaign
 Red River Campaign
 Overland Campaign
 Atlanta Campaign
 Valley Campaigns of 1864
 Bermuda Hundred Campaign
 Siege of Petersburg
 Franklin-Nashville Campaign
 Price's Raid
 Sherman's March to the Sea
 Carolinas Campaign
 Appomattox Campaign

Major battles

List of American Civil War battles
 Battle of Fort Sumter – April 12, 1861 and April 13, 1861
 First Battle of Bull Run – July 21, 1861
 Battle of Wilson's Creek – August 10, 1861
 Battle of Fort Donelson – February 12 to February 16, 1862
 Battle of Pea Ridge – March 7 and March 8, 1862
 Battle of Hampton Roads – March 8, 1862 and March 9, 1862
 Battle of Shiloh – April 6 and April 7, 1862
 Battle of New Orleans – April 25 to May 1, 1862
 Battle of Eltham's Landing - May 7, 1862
 Battle of Seven Pines – May 31 and June 1, 1862
 Seven Days Battles – June 25 to July 1, 1862
 Battle of Gaines's Mill - June 27, 1862
 Battle of Malvern Hill - July 1, 1862
 Second Battle of Bull Run – August 28 to August 30, 1862
 Battle of South Mountain - September 14, 1862
 Battle of Antietam – September 17, 1862
 Battle of Perryville – October 8, 1862
 Battle of Fredericksburg – December 11 to December 15, 1862
 Battle of Stones River – December 31, 1862 to January 2, 1863
 Battle of Chancellorsville – April 30 to May 6, 1863
 Battle of Gettysburg – July 1 to July 3, 1863
 Siege of Vicksburg – May 19 to July 4, 1863
 Battle of Chickamauga – September 19 to September 20, 1863
 Battles for Chattanooga – November 23 to November 25, 1863
 Battle of the Wilderness – May 5 to May 7, 1864
 Battle of Spotsylvania Court House – May 8 to May 21, 1864
 Battle of Cold Harbor – May 31 to June 3, 1864
 Battle of Atlanta – July 22, 1864
 Battle of Mobile Bay – August 5, 1864
 Battle of Guard Hill - August 16, 1864
 Battle of Fisher's Hill - September 21 to September 22, 1864
 Battle of Cedar Creek - October 19, 1864
 Battle of Franklin – November 30, 1864
 Battle of Nashville – December 15 to December 16, 1864
 Battle of Five Forks – April 1, 1865
 Battle of Sailor's Creek - April 6, 1865
 Battle of Appomattox Court House - April 9, 1865

Involvement, by ethnicity
 Foreign enlistment in the American Civil War
 African Americans in the American Civil War
 German Americans in the Civil War
 Hispanics in the American Civil War
 Italian Americans in the Civil War
 Irish Americans in the American Civil War
 Native Americans in the American Civil War

Involvement, by region

States
 Alabama
 Alabama in the American Civil War
 Mobile, Alabama, in the American Civil War
 Montgomery, Alabama
 Selma, Alabama, in the American Civil War
 Arizona
 Confederate Arizona
 Arizona Territory (USA)
 Arkansas
 Arkansas in the American Civil War
 California
 California in the American Civil War
 Colorado
 Colorado in the American Civil War
 Colorado in the Civil War
 Connecticut
 Connecticut in the American Civil War
 Delaware
 History of Delaware
 Florida
 Florida in the American Civil War
 Tampa in the Civil War
 Georgia
 Georgia in the American Civil War
 Atlanta in the American Civil War
 Idaho
 Idaho in the American Civil War
 Illinois
 Illinois in the American Civil War
 Indiana
 Indiana in the American Civil War
 Indianapolis in the American Civil War
 Iowa
 Iowa in the American Civil War
 Kansas
 Kansas in the American Civil War
 Kentucky
 Kentucky in the American Civil War
 Lexington, Kentucky, in the American Civil War
 Louisville, Kentucky, in the American Civil War
 Louisiana
 Louisiana in the American Civil War
 Baton Rouge in the Civil War
 New Orleans in the American Civil War
 Maine
 Maine in the American Civil War
 Maryland
 Maryland in the American Civil War
 Maryland in the Civil War
 Baltimore riot of 1861
 Massachusetts
 Massachusetts in the American Civil War
 Michigan
 Michigan in the American Civil War
 Minnesota
 History of Minnesota
 Mississippi
 Mississippi in the American Civil War
 Vicksburg, Mississippi, in the American Civil War
 Missouri
 Missouri in the American Civil War
 St. Louis in the American Civil War
 Montana
 Montana in the American Civil War
 Nebraska
 Nebraska in the American Civil War
 Nevada
 Nevada in the American Civil War
 New Hampshire
 History of New Hampshire
 New Jersey
 New Jersey in the American Civil War
 New Jersey in the Civil War
 New Mexico
 New Mexico Territory in the American Civil War
 New York
 New York in the American Civil War
 New York City in the American Civil War
 New York Draft Riots
 North Carolina
 North Carolina in the American Civil War
 Wilmington, North Carolina, in the American Civil War
 North Dakota
 North Dakota in the American Civil War
 Ohio
 Ohio in the American Civil War
 Cincinnati in the American Civil War
 Cleveland in the American Civil War
 Oklahoma
 Oklahoma in the American Civil War
 Oregon
 Oregon in the American Civil War
 Pennsylvania
 Pennsylvania in the American Civil War
 Rhode Island
 Rhode Island in the American Civil War
 South Carolina
 South Carolina in the American Civil War
 Charleston, South Carolina, in the American Civil War
 Columbia, South Carolina, in the American Civil War
 Mitchelville
 South Carolina in the Civil War
 South Dakota
 South Dakota in the American Civil War
 Tennessee
 Tennessee in the American Civil War
 Tennessee in the Civil War
 Memphis, Tennessee in the Civil War
 Texas
 Texas in the American Civil War
 Houston, Texas in the Civil War
 Utah
 Utah in the American Civil War
 Vermont
 Vermont in the American Civil War
 Virginia
 Virginia in the American Civil War
 List of American Civil War battles in Northern Virginia
 Richmond in the American Civil War
 Winchester, Virginia in the American Civil War
 Washington
 Washington in the American Civil War
 Washington, D.C.
 Washington, D.C., in the American Civil War
 West Virginia
 West Virginia in the American Civil War
 Harpers Ferry in the Civil War
 Romney, West Virginia, in the American Civil War
 Shenandoah Valley
 Wisconsin
 Wisconsin in the American Civil War
 Wyoming

Foreign countries
 Australia
 Australia and the American Civil War
 Bahamas
 Bahamas in the American Civil War
 Belize
 Toledo Settlement
 Brazil
 Santa Bárbara d'Oeste
 Americana, São Paulo
 Canada
 Canada in the American Civil War
 France
 France in the American Civil War
 Mexico
 Mexico in the American Civil War
 Second Cortina War
 Matamoros, Tamaulipas
 Bagdad, Tamaulipas
 Port Isabel, Sonora
 United Kingdom
 United Kingdom and the American Civil War

Aftermath of the war
 Assassination of Abraham Lincoln
 Civil rights movement (1896–1954)
 Alabama Claims
 Bureau of Refugees, Freedmen and Abandoned Lands
 Carpetbagger
 Confederados
 Freedman's Savings Bank
 Grand Army of the Republic
 James-Younger Gang
 Jim Crow laws
 Juneteenth
 Ku Klux Klan
 Last surviving United States war veterans
 Lost Cause of the Confederacy
 Memorial Day
 Mobile magazine explosion
 Neo-Confederate
 Old soldiers' home
 Plessy v. Ferguson
 Reconstruction era of the United States
 Redeemers
 Scalawag
 Southern Claims Commission
 Sultana
 Thirteenth Amendment to the United States Constitution
 Fourteenth Amendment to the United States Constitution
 Fifteenth Amendment to the United States Constitution
 Slavery and States' Rights
 United Confederate Veterans
 Unknown Confederate Soldier Monument in Horse Cave

Historical Reenactment
 American Civil War reenactment

Media

Books

Novels
 Gods and Generals
 Gone with the Wind
 The Killer Angels
 Little Women
 The Red Badge of Courage
 Uncle Tom's Cabin

Film, television and theatre

 Ken Burns
 Cold Mountain (film)
 Friendly Persuasion (film)
 Gettysburg (film)
 Glory (film)
 Gods and Generals (film)
 Gone with the Wind (film)
 Major Dundee
 Mourning Becomes Electra
 Ride with the Devil (film)
 Shenandoah (film)
 The Birth of a Nation
 The Good, the Bad and the Ugly
 The Horse Soldiers
 The Outlaw Josey Wales

Games

 Chancellorsville (game)
 Civil War (game)
 Dixie (card game)
 Terrible Swift Sword (game)
 Enduring Valor: Gettysburg in Miniature
 Gettysburg (game)
 Gods and Generals (video game)
 Civil War Generals 2 (video game)
 Sid Meier's Gettysburg! (video game)
 Ageod's American Civil War (video game)

Magazines

 CHARGE! (magazine)

Music

 Music of the American Civil War
 "The Night They Drove Old Dixie Down"

See also

 War
 Civil war
 Abolitionism: United States
 Manumission
 Martial law: United States of America
 Racism
 Slavery
 Treason: United States

References

External links

 Causes of the Civil War. primary sources
 Civil War Letters — Primary Sources and First Person Accounts.
 Declarations of Causes of Secession
 Alexander Stephens' Cornerstone Speech
 Lincoln's Call for Troops
 The Civil War Home Page
 The Civil War - website with more than 7,000 pages of Civil War content, including the complete run of Harper's Weekly newspapers from the Civil War.
 The American Civil War - Detailed listing of events, documents, battles, commanders and important people of the US Civil War
 Civil War: Death and Destruction - slideshow by Life magazine
 Civil War photos at the National Archives
 View images from the Civil War Photographs Collection at the Library of Congress
 University of Tennessee: U.S. Civil War Generals
 The Civil War, a PBS documentary by Ken Burns
 Individual state's contributions to the Civil War: California, Florida, Illinois #1, Illinois #2, Ohio, Pennsylvania
 WWW-VL: History: USA Civil War 1855–1865
 Civil War Preservation Trust
 Civil War Era Digital Collection at Gettysburg College This collection contains digital images of political cartoons, personal papers, pamphlets, maps, paintings and photographs from the Civil War Era held in Special Collections at Gettysburg College.
 "Fort Morgan and the Battle of Mobile Bay", a National Park Service Teaching with Historic Places (TwHP) lesson plan
 "WWW Guide to Civil War Prisons" (2004)
 TOCWOC Civil War Blog A group Civil War blog consisting of informed amateurs.
 Civil War Books and Authors Blog A Civil War blog focusing mainly on book reviews.
 Civil War Bookshelf American Civil War historiography and publishing blogged daily by Dimitri Rotov.
 American Civil War in Alabama, Encyclopedia of Alabama
 Grand Valley State University Civil War digital collection
 Seven Civil War Stories Your Teacher Never Told You by Eric Johnson, CNN, June 12, 2009
 The American Civil War Timeline Project - A community contributed project to, chronologically and geographically, map the events of the war.

Outlines of wars
Wikipedia outlines
 1
 
Civil War topics
Civil War topics